Euskal Herriak Bere Eskola (The Basque Country its own School in Basque language) or EHBE is a Basque education organization that works for a school system based on Basque language and culture. It wants to engage with other historical Basque educational organizations, as UEU, ikastolas or student activism. It was created in 2002.

Main campaigns
Since 2002 EHBE has been involved in many campaigns, specially on mobilization on different topics:
 Primary school in Basque language.
 Euskal Unibertsitatea, or Basque University.
 Euskal Curriculuma, or the development of a Basque Curricula.
 Promoting debate between different projects and sensibilities.

External links

Basque politics
Basque culture